Haliplus apicalis is a species of water beetle in the genus Haliplus. It can be found on British Isles and in North-West Europe.

References

Haliplidae
Beetles described in 1868
Beetles of Europe